Taku, also known as Taku Landing, is a locality on Graham Inlet of the Taku Arm of Tagish Lake in the Atlin District of far northwestern British Columbia, Canada.  It was the transshipment point for passengers and freight from Carcross, Yukon bound for Atlin, British Columbia and was the start of a tramway connecting Taku Arm to Atlin Lake, where another steamer ferried passengers and cargo to Atlin.

See also
Atlin Gold Rush
Klondike Gold Rush

References

Unincorporated settlements in British Columbia
Atlin District